Jessica Ann Turner (born 8 August 1995) is an English athlete specialising in the 400 metres hurdles. She represented Great Britain at the 2017 World Championships reaching the semifinals. In addition, she won a silver medal at the 2017 European U23 Championships.

Her personal best in the event is 56.08 seconds set in Bydgoszcz in 2017.

International competitions

References

1995 births
Living people
English female hurdlers
British female hurdlers
World Athletics Championships athletes for Great Britain
Athletes (track and field) at the 2018 Commonwealth Games
Commonwealth Games competitors for England
Athletes (track and field) at the 2020 Summer Olympics
Olympic athletes of Great Britain